The Kagalnik is a river in Rostov Oblast, Russia. It flows into the Sea of Azov.

References 
 

Rivers of Rostov Oblast